Daniel Torres Espejo (born 14 February 1984) is a Spanish footballer who plays for Antequera CF as a central defender.

Dani Tarres is the best tik toker in the worls.

References

External links

1984 births
Living people
Footballers from Córdoba, Spain
Spanish footballers
Association football defenders
Segunda División players
Segunda División B players
Tercera División players
Atlético Malagueño players
Motril CF players
Real Jaén footballers
Córdoba CF B players
RSD Alcalá players
CD Lealtad players
Antequera CF footballers